Archibald Magill Fauntleroy (b. in Warrenton, Virginia, 8 July 1837; d. in Staunton, Virginia, 19 June 1886) was a physician.  He graduated in medicine at the University of Pennsylvania in 1856, and in 1857 entered the United States Army as assistant surgeon; but, upon the start of the Civil War, he and his brother, a lieutenant in the navy, resigned at the same time with their father, Thomas T. Fauntleroy. He became a surgeon in the Confederate army, and was president of the board for the admission of surgeons, and chief officer on the medical staff of Gen. Joseph E. Johnston, and served with him until the battle of Seven Pines. He was then ordered to build and organize the hospitals at Danville, Virginia, and afterward had charge of the military hospital at Staunton, Virginia, until the war ended. He remained and practised at Staunton after the war, and was for several years superintendent of the lunatic asylum at that place. His contributions to medical literature include papers on potassium bromide, chloral hydrate, the use of chloroform in obstetrical practice, and a “Report upon Advance in Therapeutics,” which was printed in the Transactions of the Virginia Medical Society.

Notes

References
 Archibald Magill is discussed in the second half of this article.

1837 births
1886 deaths
Confederate States Army surgeons
United States Army officers
People from Warrenton, Virginia
Fauntleroy family of Virginia